The Equestrian events were held at the Georgia International Horse Park in Conyers, United States, 30 miles or 50 km east of Atlanta. For the first time in Olympic history, the three-day event individual and team events were held as two separate competitions. A rider could compete in both events. This format would continue on to the 2000 Olympics.

Medal summary

Medal table

Officials
Appointment of officials was as follows:

Dressage
  Linda Zang (Ground Jury President)
  Uwe Mechlem (Ground Jury Member)
  Jan Peeters (Ground Jury Member)
  Bernard Maurel (Ground Jury Member)
  Eric Lette (Ground Jury Member)

Jumping
  John Ammermann (Ground Jury President)
  José Alvarez de Bohorques (Ground Jury Member)
  Franz Pranter (Ground Jury Member)
  Francis Michielsen (Ground Jury Member)
  Linda Allen (Course Designer)
  Olaf Petersen (Technical Delegate)

Eventing
  Giovanni Grignolo  (Ground Jury President)
  Jack Le Goff (Ground Jury Member)
  Patrick Carew (Ground Jury Member)
  Bernd Springorum (Ground Jury Member)
  Roger Haller (Course Designer)
  Hugh Thomas (Technical Delegate)

References

External links
 Official Olympic Report

 
1996 Summer Olympics events
1996 Summer Olympics
1996
Summer Olympics